Dissomeria is a genus of flowering plants belonging to the family Salicaceae.

Its native range is Eastern and Western Central Tropical Africa.

Species:

Dissomeria crenata 
Dissomeria glanduligera

References

Salicaceae
Salicaceae genera